The persimmon eelpout (Eucryphycus californicus) is a species of marine ray-finned fish, an eelpout, belonging to the family Zoarcidae. It is the only species in the monospecific genus Eucryphycus. This fish is found in the eastern central Pacific Ocean off California.

References

Lycodinae
Fish described in 1911
Fish of the Pacific Ocean